Ricardo Arturo Serrano Alfaro (born 19 January 1975, in Chalatenango) is a Salvadoran football coach.

Managerial career
Nicknamed la pulga, he became coach of C.D. Chalatenango in September 2015.

References

External links
 []
 

Living people
Salvadoran football managers
1975 births